John William Mosley Jr. (June 21, 1921 – May 22, 2015) was an American football player and combat bomber pilot in the United States Army Air Forces, notably, the Tuskegee Airmen. Mosley was the first African American to play on the Colorado State University football team. He also became one of the first African Americans to be trained as a bomber pilot during World War II.

Early life
Born June 21, 1921, in Denver, Colorado, John William Mosley was the son of a Cripple Creek silver rush settler. He spent his early educational career at Whittier Elementary School, Cole Junior High School, and Manual Training High School. While attending Manual, he played football and wrestled. He was also the valedictorian, and earned the National Merit Scholarship.

Breaking the color barrier

Colorado State University 
John W. Mosley graduated from Manual High School in Denver as a National Merit Scholar, and enrolled at the Agricultural College of Colorado (now Colorado State University) in 1939. The college at that time had only eight other African American students, none of whom were allowed to live on campus. While at CSU, Mosley wanted to try out for a sport, football in particular. Mosley joined the football team under coach Harry W. Hughes in 1940, and became the first African American on the football team at Colorado State University in Fort Collins in the record keeping era. He faced discrimination from his white teammates, whom did not want him there. For example, while trying out some players purposefully hit him very hard to discourage him from joining the team. He did, however, win several players over, making two very good friends in Dude Dent and Woody Fries. In the same year, Mosley expressed an interest for wrestling, and also joined the wrestling team under coach Julius Wagner. By joining the team he became the first African American wrestler at Colorado State University. He also became the first African American to earn an athletic letter in Colorado State University football team history. He also broke the color barriers off the field when he was elected class vice president in both of his junior and senior years.

The Tuskegee Airmen 
Mosley also had been interested in being a pilot, and he paid for his own flight lessons and physical, he had gotten a physical in Denver that told him he had a heart murmur, this he believed to be false. In 1941, the all Black fighter squadron was formed at Tuskegee, called the 99th Fighter Squadron which is better known as the Tuskegee Airmen. Mosley had wanted to join them after he graduated. After graduation, Mosley was drafted into a segregated Army Artillery unit stationed in Fort Sill, Oklahoma and not the Tuskegee Airmen, despite Mosley holding a civilian pilot's license. While at Fort Sill, he began to write many letters to command and Washington, D.C. asking to be reassigned to the Tuskegee Airmen. Eventually, these letters did lead to his reassignment. He trained as a bomber pilot, one of the first African Americans to do so. He served with distinction in World War II and earned the rank of Command Pilot. He chose to return to the states as a civilian in 1946 to earn his master's degree in Social Work from the University of Denver in 1948. Soon afterwards he returned the service and fought in the Korean and Vietnam Wars. Mosley also flew during the Berlin Airlift. He finally retired from the air force in 1970 obtaining the rank of lieutenant colonel.

Civil Rights Era 
Mosley was a strong activist. During his time as a Tuskegee airmen, he was fighting for his rights and others to serve in the armed forces. His role was to integrate the military the armed forces the civil rights activities that took place in the United States. Mosley used his motivation and determination to fight for integration in the Armed forces. People would ask him why he wasn't bitter about his rights in the Armed forces. Mosley was a part of a movement to prove that he was capable of making a contribution to the development of our great nation. After being in the Tuskegee Airmen, John Mosley joined the Federal government to continue being a civil rights activist.

He married his high school friend Edna Wilson and both of them remained active in a number of professional and community organizations to help the African American community have equal rights. John Mosley served as a special assistant to the undersecretary in the Department of Health and Human Services when he and his wife moved to Aurora Colorado and was transferred to the Lowry Air Force Base. His wife became the first African American lady to become a city councilwomen in Aurora. He worked in a variety of positions including Equal Opportunity Specialist, Staff Director of the Mountain Plains Federal Regional Council and Special Assistant to James Farmer, Assistant Secretary of Administration.

Legacy

John Mosley Student-Athlete Leadership Program 
At Colorado State University, many refer to John Mosley as the Jackie Robinson of CSU athletics. In 1998 Mosley was inducted into the CSU Sports Hall of Fame, and in 2009 he was admitted into the Colorado Sports Hall of Fame. Lt. Col. John W. Mosley is Colorado State's first African American football student-athlete in the record-keeping era. He earned his degree from Colorado State in 1943, and was a member of the original Tuskegee Airmen, flying combat missions over Europe in World War II. These grand accomplishments initiated the conception of his to-be mentoring program. Mosley's impact on the diversity of athletes has led to a student-athlete mentoring program bearing his namesake.

Through a collaboration between CSU's Athletics department and the university's Black/African American Cultural Center, the John Mosley Mentoring Program was established during the 2011–2012 academic year at Colorado State University. The goals of the mentoring program are "to reduce the percentage of academic probation rates, to increase retention rates to matriculation, [and] expose [student-athletes] to positive African-American role models who have been through the rigors of academic achievement as a student-athlete and who have earned their degree". While mentorship remains an essential component to the success of the program, the program underwent a name change in 2014, becoming the John Mosley Leadership Program (JMLP). The four guiding principles of the JMLP are a) self-exploration. b) community engagement, c) transitional growth and leadership, and d) mentorship.

While at Colorado State A&M, Mosley would serve as vice president and treasurer of his class. He decided that he wanted to try out for the football team as a freshman and in doing so became the first African American football player at Colorado State since 1906. Mosley also decided he would wrestle for Coach Hans Wagner becoming the first African American wrestler in school and state history. Mosley earned all-conference honors in wrestling. In football, he lettered for three years becoming the first African American letter winner in CSU football history.

Following his retirement in 1970, Mosley continued his leadership actions by becoming a spokesperson for black athletes and the Tuskegee Airmen. Mosley received numerous awards such as the Anti-Defamation League Torch of Liberty award, an honorary doctorate from CSU as well as the Congressional Gold Medal by then President Bush.

Much like the legacy of Jackie Robinson, Colorado State University & the memory of CSU Ram Lt. Col. John Mosley continue to inspire student-athletes and future Rams.

Mile High Flight Program Tuskegee Airmen Inc. 
During the second World War, John W. Mosley tried to join the air camp of the United States Tuskegee Airmen is not just a flight school to learn how to fly but also a great motivator for anybody with a dream that is never too big. Mosley and his flight crew gave many motivational tendencies to young minorities to inspire them to go out and be who they want to be no matter the fight within the fight.

John and Edna Mosley Scholarship Fund 
After years of serving the community, friends and community members raised money to present to the Mosley's to allow them to go on vacation abroad to enjoy themselves. The community raised thousands of dollars to honor and show thanks to the Mosley's philanthropy throughout the years. The Mosley's instead had a different plan for this money: they agreed to accept the money raised, if only they could start a scholarship fund with it, instead of a vacation for themselves. Since its start in 2002 this scholarship fund has helped numerous African American students from the Denver-Metro area, equaling in $28,000 worth of scholarship dollars given to the recipients. The requirements for this scholarship include: one must be African American, have a desire to further their education in a University, College or another accredited post-secondary school and must have accumulated a GPA of 2.5 of higher. This scholarship fund looks for students who take charge of their lives to better them, such as maintaining good grades and having leadership roles, once the finalist are accepted the scholarship board will then hold interviews to ensure that the Mosley scholarship is awarded to the perfect candidate to honor the Mosley's. This scholarship fund is now the largest and oldest community fund in the entire state of Colorado. Following his death, the Mosley family asked the public to please not send the family flowers, but instead donate a dollar to his scholarship fund to honor one of his life goals to help African American students achieve their full potential in post-secondary education.

Edna and John W. Mosley Elementary School 
Due to the impact that John W. Mosley as well as his wife Edna had in the Aurora Community, Aurora's Mayor, Steve Hogan, decided to dedicate a school to the individuals. The school, Edna and John W. Mosley P-8, opened on October 1, 2015, near Airport Boulevard and 2nd Avenue in Aurora, Colorado. Currently, it is occupying more than 900 students.

See also
 Dogfights (TV series)
 Executive Order 9981
 Freeman Field Mutiny
 List of Tuskegee Airmen
 Military history of African Americans
 The Tuskegee Airmen (movie)

References

http://www.coloradoaggies.com/SpecialFeature.html
http://www.coloradoaggies.com/Hughesp2.html

1921 births
2015 deaths
Players of American football from Denver
African-American players of American football
Colorado State Rams football players
Tuskegee Airmen
United States Army Air Forces pilots of World War II
United States Army Air Forces officers
Aviators from Colorado
African-American aviators
21st-century African-American people
20th-century African-American sportspeople